The Canberra distance is a numerical measure of the distance between pairs of points in a vector space, introduced in 1966
and refined in 1967 by Godfrey N. Lance and William T. Williams. It is a weighted version of L₁ (Manhattan) distance.
The Canberra distance has been used as a metric for comparing ranked lists and for intrusion detection in computer security. It has also been used to analyze the gut microbiome in different disease states.

Definition 
The Canberra distance d between vectors p and q in an n-dimensional real vector space is given as follows:

where 
 
are vectors.

The Canberra metric, Adkins form, divides the distance d by (n-Z) where Z is the number of attributes that are 0 for p and q.

See also
Normed vector space
Metric
Manhattan distance

Notes

References 
 

Digital geometry
Metric geometry
Distance